Hubaysh-i Tiflisi (died  or 1231) was an author who composed several scientific works in Persian and to a lesser degree Arabic during his stay in Seljuk-ruled Anatolia.

References

Sources 
 
 
 
 
 

13th-century deaths
Scholars from the Sultanate of Rum
People from Tbilisi
12th-century Persian-language writers
Arabic-language writers
12th-century births